Franklin Delano Roosevelt High School is a public high school located in Hyde Park, New York in Dutchess County. Named for President Franklin D. Roosevelt, who grew up in Hyde Park, the school serves about 1,300 students in grades 9 to 12 in the Hyde Park Central School District.

History

The original high school building (now Haviland Middle School) was built on land donated to the town by local farmer Ben Haviland. Construction began in 1938 and was one of three schools erected as a Depression-era Public Works Administration project in Hyde Park.

It was originally called the Franklin Delano Roosevelt Junior-Senior High School and may be the only public high school in the United States built under the auspices of, and named for, a sitting president. President Roosevelt dedicated the school to the town in 1940, and the school graduated its first class in 1941.

As enrollment increased, the town began construction on the current high school building which opened in 1965. An addition was added to the rear of the school in 1976. The outdoor athletic complex was upgraded in 2013 with a new multi-sport football field, grandstands, track and field facilities, and a concession stand.

The original building was listed on the National Register of Historic Places in 2011.

Notable alumni

Artists
Joe Quinones, comic book artist best known for his work on such titles as Spider-Man, Star Wars, and the Eisner award-winning, Wednesday Comics.

Authors
Carolyn Adams Garcia — author, artist, former wife of Jerry Garcia
Keith W. Olson — author of 20th-century history in U.S.
Justin Taylan — World War II historian and author
Bradford Pearson — journalist and author of "The Eagles of Heart Mountain" (2021)

Business
Anthony Noto — current Chief Executive Officer of SoFi (Social Finance, Inc)

Film and television
Bill Duke — actor and film director
Hafsteinn Hafsteinsson — Icelandic actor in film, television and advertising

Music
Jeff Tyzik — conductor, arranger, and trumpeter with the Rochester Philharmonic Orchestra

Sports
Wes Bialosuknia — former professional basketball player with 1967–1968 Oakland Oaks in ABA
Craig Capano — former professional soccer player who played for Chicago Fire (2002–2006) of MLS, and USA U-20s
Frank Cimorelli — former professional baseball pitcher for 1994 St. Louis Cardinals
Will Daniels — professional basketball player with Nizhny Novgorod in Euroleague
Ricky Horton — former Major League Baseball pitcher for St. Louis Cardinals and 1988 World Series champion Los Angeles Dodgers; broadcaster on Fox Sports Midwest
C. J. Hunter — former Olympic shot putter and gold medalist at 1999 World Championship
Patrick Manning — five-time member of U.S. National Rowing Team and silver medalist at 1992 Summer Olympics in Barcelona in men's heavyweight coxless four
Jeff Pierce — former middle relief pitcher for the Boston Red Sox
Richard Rinaldi — former professional basketball player with Baltimore Bullets and New York Nets in ABA
Brett Wilkinson — former member of U.S. National Rowing Team who competed at 2004 Summer Olympics in men's quadruple sculls
Kyle Winter — former professional rugby player and member of 2009 Indonesian National Rugby Team

See also

List of high schools in New York#Dutchess County
National Register of Historic Places listings in Dutchess County, New York

References

Hyde Park, New York
Monuments and memorials to Franklin D. Roosevelt in the United States
National Register of Historic Places in Dutchess County, New York
Public high schools in Dutchess County, New York
School buildings on the National Register of Historic Places in New York (state)
1940 establishments in New York (state)